Luke David Berry (born 12 July 1992) is an English professional footballer who plays as a midfielder for  club Luton Town.

Career

Cambridge City and Cambridge United
Born in Cambridge, Berry played for Comberton Crusaders before joining Cambridge City F.C. Youth Development squad playing Cambridge City's youth system. He then went with Jez George (a former Director of Cambridge City F.C.) to Cambridge United's youth setup before making the step up to the first team squad in July 2009.

Barnsley
On 29 July 2014, Berry signed for Barnsley, who were newly relegated into League One on a three-year contract for an undisclosed fee. He made his Football League debut in their 1–0 opening day defeat at home to Crawley Town, in which he was substituted for Nana Boakye-Yiadom in the 78th minute. Berry scored his first goal for Barnsley in a Football League Trophy tie against Oldham Athletic on 7 October 2014, which they lost 4–2 in a penalty shoot-out after the match finished as a 2–2 draw. He scored his first league goal with a stoppage time equaliser in a 1–1 draw at home to Peterborough United on 18 April 2015.

Cambridge United
On 15 June 2015, Berry re-signed for Cambridge United on a four-year contract for an undisclosed fee. He scored four goals in their 4–0 win at home to Coventry City in the FA Cup second round on 4 December 2016, ensuring their progression to the third round.

Luton Town
On 25 August 2017, Berry signed for League Two rivals Luton Town on a three-year contract for an undisclosed fee, with the option of a further year.

Career statistics

Honours
Cambridge United
FA Trophy: 2013–14
Conference Premier play-offs: 2014

Luton Town
EFL League One: 2018–19

Individual
PFA Team of the Year: 2016–17 League Two, 2017–18 League Two

References

External links
Profile at the Luton Town F.C. website

1992 births
Living people
Sportspeople from Cambridge
English footballers
Association football midfielders
Cambridge United F.C. players
Barnsley F.C. players
Luton Town F.C. players
National League (English football) players
English Football League players